Zisi (c. 481–402 BCE), born Kong Ji (孔伋), was a Chinese philosopher and the grandson of Confucius.

Intellectual genealogy, teaching, criticism 
Zisi was the son of Kong Li (孔鯉) (Boyu (伯鱼)) and the only grandson of Confucius. He is traditionally accredited with transmitting Confucian teaching to Mencius and writing the Doctrine of the Mean, Biaoji 表記, "Ziyi" (The Black Robes") 緇衣, and "Fangji" (The Record of the Dikes) 坊記, presently chapters of the Liji. (Since Zisi's dates of life do not overlap with those of Mengzi, it has been suggested that the intermediary role in the transmission was played by Shi Shuo 世碩.)
 
Where his grandfather began to distinguish between true and supposed knowledge, Zisi proceeded upon meditations on the relativity in human knowledge of the universe. He attempted to analyse as many types of action as possible, and believed that wise people who are conscious of their moral and intellectual duties can copy the reality of the universe into themselves.

On par with Mencius, Zisi is attacked by Xunzi in his famous "Against Twelve Masters" chapter. The target of Xunzi's attack is the Wuxing teaching. According to Zhang Binglin (1868-1936), Zisi attempted combining Confucian teaching with the principles of numerology. Li Xueqin suggests that it was done under influence of the text presently constituting the "Great Plan" (Hongfan) chapter of the Shangshu.

The extant version of the book of the same name is ascribed to Zisi. It was compiled by Wang Zhuo (汪晫 Wāng Zhuó) of the Song dynasty, but not recognized as authentic. The more reliable edition was made by Huang Yizhou (1828-1899), drawing the references from Shen Yue (441-513). According to Huang Yizhou, some aspects of Zisi's thinking are paralleled by the Huainanzi.

Recent discoveries
Wuxing (text), a recent archeological discovery providing new insight into Zisi's teaching.
Duke Mu of Lu Asks Zisi 《魯穆公問子思》, a Guodian text relating about the concept of the "loyal minister" 忠臣 through the dialogue between Zisi and the young Duke Mu (d. 377 BCE).

See also
Zengzi, the purported author of the Great Learning. The Great Learning and Zisi's Doctrine of the Mean, two of the Four Books, constituted the foundation of the Confucian orthodoxy.

Notes

References 
 Pan, Fuen, "Zisi". Encyclopedia of China (Philosophy Edition), 1st ed.

External links

480s BC births
402 BC deaths
5th-century BC Chinese philosophers
Chinese Confucianists
Descendants of Confucius
Philosophers from Lu (state)
Zhou dynasty philosophers